Scomberesocoidea is a superfamily within the suborder Exocoetoidei of the order Beloniformes. It consists of two families which are commonly known as the needlefishes and the sauries.

Classification
The two families within the suborder Scomberesocoidea are:

 Family Belonidae Bonaparte, 1835 (Needlefishes)
 Family Scomberesocidae Bleeker 1859 (Sauries)

References

Beloniformes